Box Canyon Dam is a gravity-type hydroelectric dam on the Pend Oreille River, in northeastern Washington state in the United States.

It has a capacity of 90 MW and an average expected production of 60 MW. The reservoir extends . It produces power using four Kaplan turbines. An upgrade completed in 2015 brought the dam's rated capacity up to 90 MW from the original 69 MW.

See also

List of dams in the Columbia River watershed

References

External links

Dams in Washington (state)
Hydroelectric power plants in Washington (state)
Buildings and structures in Pend Oreille County, Washington
United States local public utility dams
Dams completed in 1956
Energy infrastructure completed in 1956
Dams on the Pend Oreille River
Gravity dams